Tonganoxichnus (‘Tonganoxie, Kansas trace’) is a Pennsylvanian to Permian trace fossil that has been found in North America.

The ichnogenus originally included two ichnospecies found in close association. T. buildexensis is interpreted as the resting trace of a primitive insect, often preserving the outline of the insect's underside in great detail. T. ottawensis is interpreted as a jumping trace, likely of the same kind of insect, and provides evidence of jumping as an important form of locomotion in the earliest insects. The trace fossils are found in beds typical of the inner freshwater reaches of estuaries but subject to tides. This provides evidence of the environment in which the first insects evolved.

References

Arthropod trace fossils
Insects